Champu or Chapu-Kavya (Devanagari: चम्पू-काव्य) is a genre of literary composition in Indian literature. The word 'Champu' means a combination of poetry and prose. A champu-kavya consists of a mixture of prose (Gadya-Kavya) and poetry passages (Padya-Kavya), with verses interspersed among prose sections.

We can see champu-kavya right from the Vedic period. Ithareya Brahmans Harishchandropakyana is the main example, that it is originated from Vedic period. Champu-kavya
is seen in 2nd century AD, on rock inscription of Rudradaman, at Junagadh. It is also seen in Ramayana, Mahabharata, Puranas, and the other Mahakavyas and was a later development in the style of writing.

Works in Champu style

Kannada
Adikavi Pampa, the Adikavi, one of the greatest Kannada poets of all time and one among the ratnatrayaru, pioneered this style when he wrote his classical works,  Vikramarjuna Vijaya (Pampa Bharata) and Adipurana in it, around 940 CE, and which served as the model for all future works in Kannada.

There is evidence to believe  Gunavarma I ,the poet who flourished at the court of King Ereyappa (864-913 C.E),was the first poet to compose Kannada Champu Kavyas. His work includes Harivamsha and Shudraka.

In Kannada literature, this metre was popularised by the Chalukya court poets, like Adikavi Pampa (902 CE -975 CE), who wrote his Adipurana in Champu style popularizing it. Also known as champu-kavya) was the most popular written form from the 9th century onwards, although it started to fall into disuse in the 12th century. When people moved towards other Sanskritic metres like tripadi (three line verse), the saptapadi (seven line verse), the ashtaka (eight line verse), the shataka (hundred-line verse), hadugabba (song-poem) and free verse metres.

Other works in Hoysala literature period were also in this style.

Telugu
Telugu poets have used the champu way of rendering poetry. Krishnamaacharya carried this tradition of Champu Marga step further by putting his writings mainly in devotional prose called Vachana.

In Telugu literature, the most acclaimed Champu work is Nannaya Bhattarakudu's Andhra Mahabharatam, produced around the 11th century, which is rendered in the Champu style, is so chaste and polished and of such a high literary merit.

Odia
Odia literature is also replete with the champu style poetry. Kabisurjya Baladeba Ratha, Banamali Dasa, Dinakrushna Das are some of the most famous poets who wrote Champu.

In Odia literature too, there are numerous works in this genre. There is an added feature though- a Champu in Odia usually has 34 songs, one for each consonant of the alphabet. This rule, though absent in Sanskrit definitions is followed in most of the creations of the Champu genre in Odia. All lines of a song start with its assigned letter. The most famous work is 18th century poet Kabisurjya Baladeba Ratha's Kisorachandrananda Champu, often shortened to simply Kisori Champu. It narrates the tale of Radha and Krishna's romance in 34 Odissi songs set to different ragas & talas. The Champu is one of the most important works of Odissi music.

Sanskrit
Prahlādacharita a Sanskrit work written by Rama Varma Parikshith Thampuran, former Maharaja of Cochin is in Champu style.

Sri Gopala Champu of Jiva Gosvami is in champu style.

Notes

External links
 Sanskrit Literature Classification

Sanskrit literature
Kannada literature
Sanskrit poetry
Literary genres
Medieval Indian literature